Tverrfjellet is a mountain in Vang Municipality in Innlandet county, Norway. The mountain is surrounded by several other notable mountains including Suletinden and Sulefjellet to the northwest, Skoddetinden to the west, Kljåkinnknippene and Ørnenosi to the south, and Øyre and Grindene to the southeast.

See also
List of mountains of Norway by height

References

Vang, Innlandet
Mountains of Innlandet